Abdullah Al-Zahrani  [عبد الله الزهراني in Arabic] (born 18 September 1993) is a Saudi football player who plays as a goalkeeper.

References

External links 
 

1993 births
Living people
Saudi Arabian footballers
Al-Raed FC players
Al-Mujazzal Club players
Place of birth missing (living people)
Saudi Professional League players
Saudi First Division League players
Association football goalkeepers